Rohana Kumara was a Sri Lankan journalist. He was the  chief editor of the pro-opposition Sinhala-language newspaper Satana. He was shot dead while he was travelling to go home in a taxi after he had received a call that his house had been attacked.He was facing a series of defamation cases  for  writing about government corruption.Free Media Movement and Sunday Leader accused  Chandrika Kumaratunga`s security unit of being behind the attack and murder of Rohana Kumara and shielding the killers.

Rohana Kumara had earlier been detained in 1996 under the Prevention of Terrorism Act after he reported government losses during Battle of Mullaitivu in 1996 in which the rebel LTTE routed Sri Lankan army and putting up news posters  calling for the resignation of Anuruddha Ratwatte the deputy defense minister holding him responsible for the defeat.The posters stated 
"Who is responsible for the Mullaitivu debacle? Dead bodies in the south.
Ratwatte [Deputy Defence Minister] resign! Read the newspaper Hoo!"
Four other employees of the newspaper were also detained.But they along with Rohana Kumara were freed.

Minister Mahinda Wijesekara had threatened  to kill  Satana editor Rohana Kumara, the Sunday Leader editor Lasantha Wickramatunga,  and Ravaya editor Victor Ivan for articles about corruption in his ministry in the lobby of the Sri Lankan Parliament and openly discussed plans .

References

1999 deaths
Deaths by firearm in Sri Lanka
Assassinated Sri Lankan journalists
People murdered in Sri Lanka
Year of birth missing